The Rural Municipality of Fox Valley No. 171 is a rural municipality (RM) in the Canadian province of Saskatchewan within Census Division No. 8 and  Division No. 3.

History 
The RM of Keebleville No. 171 was originally incorporated as a rural municipality on October 29, 1913. Its name was changed to the RM of Fox Valley No. 171 on November 27, 1926.

Geography

Communities and localities 
The following urban municipalities are surrounded by the RM.

Villages
Fox Valley, Saskatchewan

The following unincorporated communities are within the RM.

Localities
Inglebright, Saskatchewan
Linacre, Saskatchewan

Demographics 

Government 
The RM of Fox Valley No. 171 is governed by an elected municipal council and an appointed administrator that meets on the second Thursday of every month. The reeve of the RM is Anthony Hoffart while its administrator is Stephanie MacPhail. The RM's office is located in Fox Valley.

Transportation 
Roads
Highway 21—serves Fox Valley, Saskatchewan
Highway 371—intersects Highway 21

See also 
List of rural municipalities in Saskatchewan

References 

F